Love for Share is a 2006 Indonesian film directed by Nia Dinata. It tells three interrelated stories. It was submitted to the  79th Academy Awards as Indonesia's official submission for the Best Foreign Language Film, but was not nominated. The film received Golden Orchid Award as Best Foreign Language Film at the Hawaii Film Festival in 2007.

The film tells the intersecting stories of three women: Salma is a gynecologist who questions the morality of polygamy. But as a faithful Muslim, she accepts her polygamous husband, despite the problems he causes. Siti is a village girl who gets tricked into a polygamous household in a Jakarta slum. Ming is a beautiful young waitress who becomes the mistress of a married man to further her ambitions.

Cast
Jajang C. Noer as Salma
Shanty as Siti
Dominique Agisca Diyose as Ming
El Manik as Mr. Haji Ali Rohim
Tio Pakusadewo as Koh Abun
Lukman Sardi as Mr. Lik
Nungki Kusumastuti as Indri
Ria Irawan as Sri
Ira Maya Sopha as Cik Linda
Winky Wiryawan as Nadim
Rieke Diah Pitaloka as Dwi
Reuben Elishama as Firman
Atiqah Hasiholan as Fatima
Janna Soekasah as Santi
Melissa Karim as Cik Linda's daughter

Cameos
Ikke Nurjanah as herself
Lula Kamal as Dr. Lula
Alvin Adam as Dr. Joko
Dewi Irawan as Professor Opponent of Polygamy
Maudy Koesnaedi as Talkshow Presenter
Laudya Cynthia Bella as the fourth wife
Aming as taxi driver
Erwin Parengkuan
Wak Ujang
Yuanita Christiani as Cik Linda's daughter
Ronny P. Tjandra as Koh Afung
Rusdi Rukmarata as acting coach

Soundtrack
OST. Berbagi Suami is a compilation album released under the label Aksara Records in 2006 to accompany the film. Musicians on the album include the indie rock group Sore.

References

External links

2006 films
2000s Indonesian-language films
2006 comedy-drama films
Films shot in Indonesia
Polygamy in fiction
Indonesian comedy-drama films
LGBT-related comedy-drama films
Indonesian LGBT-related films